Pyaj Kachori (pronounced as kaandaa  k-chō-rē) (Onion Kachori) is a kind of  Rajasthani Kachori, a fried pastry filled with a spicy onion filling. Popularity of this snack dish increased in other parts of North India when Rajasthani restaurants and food outlets opened throughout India. Pyaz ki kachori is a very popular morning breakfast of large number of peoples of Rajasthan. Steaming hot spicy Pyaz ki Kachori, in circular shape are available in maximum namkeen shops of the state.

References

Rajasthani cuisine
Indian snack foods